Luke 22 is the twenty-second chapter of the Gospel of Luke in the New Testament of the Christian Bible. It commences in the days just before the Passover or Feast of Unleavened Bread, and records the plot to kill Jesus Christ; the institution of the Lord's Supper; and the Arrest of Jesus and his trial before the Sanhedrin.

The author of this book is unattributed, however early Christian tradition generally considers that Luke the Evangelist composed this Gospel as well as the Acts of the Apostles. This chapter initiates this gospel's passion narrative; if the apocalyptic discourse in Luke 21 "bases all its thought upon the reality of the Kingdom", it also "leads directly into the passion narrative [which] shows how it was established".

Text

The original text was written in Koine Greek. This chapter is divided into 71 verses. It is the second longest chapter in the gospel in terms of number of verses.

Textual witnesses
Some early manuscripts containing the text of this chapter are:
Papyrus 75 (175-225)
Papyrus 69 (3rd century; extant verses 41,45-48, 58-61)
Uncial 0171 (~300; extant verses 44-50,52-56,61,63-64)
Codex Vaticanus (325-350)
Codex Sinaiticus (330-360)
Codex Bezae (~400)
Codex Washingtonianus (~400)
Codex Alexandrinus (400-440)
Codex Ephraemi Rescriptus (~450; extant verses 1-18)

Verses 1-6

 describes the plot to kill Jesus, by the chief priests and scribes, in collaboration with Judas Iscariot. This scene is also depicted in Mark 14:1–2, 10–11 and Matthew 26:1-5, 14–16. Luke's wording emphasises that Judas sought to betray Jesus "when no crowd was present", reflecting the chief priests' and scribes' fear that they could not openly arrest Jesus because of his popular support. John 11:45-57 also records the plot to kill Jesus.

Verse 3
Then Satan entered Judas, surnamed Iscariot, who was numbered among the twelve.
Luke alone of the synoptic writers sets the earthly events of the passion in the context of an eschatological battle with Satan.

Verses 7-13
 describes how Jesus sent Peter and John to prepare "a furnished upper room" (verse 12) for their taking of a Passover meal (which would be the Last Supper). This preparation is also depicted in Mark 14:12–16 and Matthew 26:17-25. Luke's is the only account which names the apostles (verse 8) and the only narrative in which Jesus takes the initiative in arranging the meal: in Matthew and Mark, the disciples raise the subject.

The farewell address

 has been described as "Jesus' farewell address", modeled after other farewell addresses in the Greco-Roman and biblical traditions.

Verse 15
Then He said to them, “With fervent desire I have desired to eat this Passover with you before I suffer.
Jesus declares to his apostles that "with fervent desire" (epithumia epithumesa) he has longed to celebrate this Passover with them. Pope Gregory X used these words as his text at the Second Council of Lyons in 1274, in his sermon on the unity of the churches.

Verse 16
For I tell you, I will not eat it again until it finds fulfillment in the kingdom of God.
The word "again" is not in the Greek, but implied, and similarly in verse 18:
For I tell you I will not drink again from the fruit of the vine until the kingdom of God comes.
The Textus Receptus includes the word οὐκέτι in verse 16 but not verse 18.

Verses 40-42
Pray that you will not fall into temptation (New International Version)
Not my will, but yours, be done (New King James Version)
The words reflect Jesus' previous instructions to his disciples on how to pray (the Lord's Prayer), although the words "thy will be done, on earth as it is in heaven" do not appear in the earliest-known versions of Luke's Lord's Prayer. The Pulpit Commentary suggests that "the temptation in question was the grave sin of moral cowardice into which so soon the disciples fell".

Verses 43-44
Then an angel appeared to Him from heaven, strengthening Him. And being in agony, He prayed more earnestly. Then His sweat became like great drops of blood falling down to the ground.
The authenticity of Luke 22:43-44 has been disputed by scholars since the second half of the 19th century. The verses are placed in double brackets in modern editions of the Greek text, and listed in a footnote in the Revised Standard Version.

Verse 45

When He rose up from prayer, and had come to His disciples, He found them sleeping from sorrow.
Luke adds "from sorrow", words which do not appear in the accounts of Matthew or Mark.

Verse 70
εἶπαν δὲ πάντες Σὺ οὖν εἶ ὁ Υἱὸς τοῦ Θεοῦ; ὁ δὲ πρὸς αὐτοὺς ἔφη Ὑμεῖς λέγετε ὅτι ἐγώ εἰμι.
Eipan de pantes, "Su oun ei ho Huios tou Theou?"; ho de pros autous ephē, "Humeis legete hoti egō eimi."

All of them asked, “Are you, then, the Son of God?” He said to them, “You say that I am”. (New Revised Standard Version)
The New King James Version adds "rightly":“You rightly say that I am".Similarly, J. B. Phillips translates as:“You are right; I am”, Jesus told them. 
The Pulpit Commentary describes the style here as rabbinic: "by such an answer, the one interrogated accepts as his own affirmation the question put to him in its entirety."

Verse 71And they said, "What further testimony do we need? For we have heard it ourselves from His own mouth".''
We have heard it ourselves that he "gives Himself out to be the Messiah". The chapter ends with the anticipated rejection of Jesus' self-witness and his resulting condemnation.

See also 
 Gethsemane
 Hematidrosis
 Holy Week
 Jerusalem
 Last Supper
 Ministry of Jesus
 Sanhedrin
 Other related Bible parts: Psalm 41, Matthew 26, Mark 14, John 18, 1 Corinthians 11

References

External links 

 King James Bible - Wikisource
English Translation with Parallel Latin Vulgate
Online Bible at GospelHall.org (ESV, KJV, Darby, American Standard Version, Bible in Basic English)
Multiple bible versions at Bible Gateway (NKJV, NIV, NRSV etc.)

 
Gospel of Luke chapters
Sanhedrin